Margareta Andersson (born 1948) is a Swedish Centre Party politician. She was a member of the Riksdag from 1995 to 2006.

External links
 Margareta Andersson at the Riksdag website 

1948 births
Living people
Members of the Riksdag from the Centre Party (Sweden)
Women members of the Riksdag
Members of the Riksdag 1994–1998
Members of the Riksdag 1998–2002
Members of the Riksdag 2002–2006
20th-century Swedish women politicians
20th-century Swedish politicians
21st-century Swedish women politicians